Irene Zazians (August 20, 1927 – July 28, 2012), known mononymously as Irene, was an Iranian-Armenian actress of cinema and television. She worked with famous Iranian new wave directors both before and after the 1979 revolution, such as Samuel Khachikian, Amir Naderi, Nosrat Karimi, Masoud Kimiyayi, and Alireza Davood Nejad. Her two films after the revolution, The Red Line directed by Kimiyayi and The Reward by Davood Nejad, were banned.

She also appeared in four TV series. She portrayed Mahde Olya (Nasereddin Shah's mother) in Soltan-e Sahebgheran directed by Ali Hatami in 1976. Her role in Hezar Dastan, another series directed by Ali Hatami, was cut out. After the Iranian revolution she was banned from taking part in any artistic activities. She travelled to Germany, where she re-trained as a beautician. She returned to Iran in 1986, during the harshest time of the Iran-Iraq war. Her last performance in cinema was in Shirin in 2008, a film by Abbas Kiarostami. She died of lung cancer in 2012 in Tehran.

Early life and career
Irene was born in an Armenian family who had immigrated to Babolsar, Iran, after surviving the Armenian genocide. Her father was Alexander Zazians and her mother's name was Varia. Her father was from Western Armenia, while her mother was from the east. Irene was their fourth child, but all of the first three children died of causes such as disease. She went to "Shahdokht" school in Babolsar. She started acting in the Ferdowsi theater when she was 19. In 1951 she joined the Noushin group in Sa'di theater, performing in works including Oscar Wilde's Lady Windermere's Fan. She married Mohammad Asemi, also an actor in the Noushin theater, when she was 16.

Film career

After some years in theater she joined the cinema industry in 1958, acting in films such as The Man who Suffered directed by Mohammad Ali Jafari and Awaited by Ataollah Zahed. Her next film was The Messenger from Heaven directed by Samuel Khachikian, also an Iranian Armenian. At the time Iranian women could not act in sexy clothes, but because Irene was of an Armenian family, she did not have that limitation and wore a two-piece swim suit   in The Messenger from Heaven. The film was on screen for four days, but then was renditioned five times for its taboo scenes. In 1958 Siamak Yasemi invited her to perform in a movie named The Spring of Life. This was Mohammad Ali Fardin's first film. In the early 1970s she worked with many Iranian new wave directors such as Amir Naderi (Goodbye Friend), Masoud Kimiyai (Baluch), Khosrow Haritash (Speeding Naked till High Noon) and Shapoor Gharib (The Rooster).

Mohallel
Among her most acclaimed and controversial roles was the portrayal of a traditional Iranian Muslim woman in Mohallel while she was Armenian. The Islamic term mohallel (Nikah halala) refers to a man marrying a divorced woman so that she can marry her ex-husband after they have already divorced three times. Couples cannot remarry for a fourth time until the ex-wife marries another man, to ensure that divorce is not taken lightly.

Nosrat Karimi directed the film Mohallel in 1972. After all Iranian stars rejected the role, he turned to Irene, an Armenian. She spent time in a traditional Iranian household to observe their lifestyle. However, some Shia mojtaheds such as Morteza Motahhari wrote bitter criticisms of the film in Kayhan. Other critics defended Irene's performance, and Zazians was nominated for a Sepas award that year. The film only remained on screens for three days and was renditioned.

Television career
She played in four TV series. One was Soltan-e Sahebgheran, a historical TV series about Nasereddin shah Qajar and Amirkabir and their assassination. Zazians portrayed Mahd-e Olya, Shah's mother in the series.  Another TV series was Abunasr's Throne, based on a story of Sadegh Hedayat and a screenplay by Ahmad Shamlu. Her latter two series were I Love You, I Love You, directed by Morteza Alavi, and Hezar Dastan, also by Ali Hatami, which was screened after the Iranian revolution with her role being totally cut out.

Personal life

Zazians married twice; first when she was age 16, to Mohammad Asemi, an actor in the Noushin group. Asemi was also a poet and a writer and was a member of Tudeh Party of Iran. Their marriage was not stable and they got divorced. From this marriage, Irene was sometimes called Irene Asemi, her ex-husband's family name.  After that, she married director and producer, Shahrokh Rafi which also ended in divorce.

After the Iranian Revolution Irene was banned from performing as an actress, so she travelled to Germany to live with her sister. She only stayed there for two years and returned to Iran in 1986. During her time in Germany, she had retrained in cosmetology and, after coming back to Iran, she also worked as a beautician.

Death
She suffered lung cancer in the last decade of her life.  She had three surgeries and was working less, as recommended by her doctors. She died on July 28, 2012 in Tehran. She is buried in the Armenian cemetery in Khavaran road in southeast Tehran.

Filmography

References

External links

1927 births
2012 deaths
People from Babolsar
People from Tehran
Iranian Christians
Iranian film actresses
Iranian stage actresses
Ethnic Armenian actresses
Deaths from cancer in Iran
Iranian television actresses
20th-century Iranian actresses
Deaths from lung cancer in Iran
Iranian people of Armenian descent